There's No Time for Love, Charlie Brown is the ninth prime-time animated TV specials based upon the popular comic strip Peanuts, by Charles M. Schulz. This marks the on-screen debut of Marcie, who first appeared on the comic strip in 1971. It was originally aired on the CBS network on March 11, 1973.

There is no clear plotline for this special. It is presented as a series of sketches based on various Peanuts strips.

The special was released on DVD as a bonus feature (along with another Peanuts special Someday You'll Find Her, Charlie Brown) on January 6, 2004. It was also released in remastered form as part of the DVD box set, Peanuts 1970's Collection, Volume One. It had been previously released on CED in 1981, and on VHS by Kartes Video Communications in 1987, and by Paramount on January 11, 1995. The special occasionally saw airings on the American TV channel Nickelodeon from 1998 to 2000 as part of Nickelodeon's umbrella branding for Peanuts programming, You're on Nickelodeon, Charlie Brown!.

Plot
There are three months of school left and all of the Peanuts gang are under pressure from too many tests and homework assignments. They now have to make preparations to write a report on a field trip to an art museum.

Charlie Brown's grades are falling from A to C and he has to receive a big grade on his museum report in order to salvage his grades for the entire term. Simultaneously, he must fight off the distraction of Peppermint Patty and her classmate Marcie (in her animated debut), both of whom have feelings for him. Unfortunately, on the way to the art museum, Charlie Brown, his sister Sally, Peppermint Patty, Marcie, and Snoopy inadvertently arrive in a supermarket and mistake it for the art museum. When Linus shows Charlie Brown and Lucy slides that resemble the works he took pictures of, Charlie Brown's hopes of salvaging his grades are shattered. As he waits for his graded report, he expects the worst of it all. However, everything works out for the best, as his teacher assumes his report is a description of an art museum described through the metaphor of a supermarket and she gives him an A in his report that pass his course.

Peppermint Patty later apologizes to Charlie Brown for saying bad things to him and that it was not easy for a girl to talk like that to a boy. But Peppermint Patty angrily blows Charlie Brown away after Charlie Brown brings up the Little Red-Haired Girl. Marcie, who was watching this and calling her 'sir' throughout the special, reminded Peppermint Patty that she said the wrong thing again like she did in the supermarket. Peppermint Patty then asks Marcie if she knows how annoying it is being called 'sir' a lot when she tells her not to. Marcie responds, "No, ma'am".

Cast and characters
 Chad Webber as Charlie Brown
 Stephen Shea as Linus van Pelt
 Robin Kohn as Lucy van Pelt
 Hilary Momberger as Sally Brown
 James Ahrens as Marcie
 Todd Barbee as Franklin
 Christopher DeFaria as Peppermint Patty
 Bill Melendez as Snoopy
Violet, Patty, and Frieda made cameo appearances but they are silent.

Music score
The score was performed by the Vince Guaraldi Quintet on January 15, February 22 and 26, 1973, at Wally Heider Studios, featuring Tom Harrell (trumpet), Pat O'Hara (flute), Seward McCain (bass) and Glenn Cronkhite (drums).

"Early Wake-Up"
"" (version 1, opening credits)
"Pitkin County Blues"
"" (version 2)
"Play It Again, Charlie Brown" (aka "Charlie's Blues" and "Charlie Brown Blues")
"African Sleigh Ride"
"Joe Cool" (Lead vocal: Vince Guaraldi)
"Peppermint Patty" (brass version)
"Apple Jack" (variation of “Linus and Lucy”)
"Bus Me"
"" (version 3, electric keyboard version)
"Linus and Lucy" (electric guitar version)
"Incumbent Waltz" (piano + electric guitar version)
"" (version 4, brass)
"" (version 5, wah-wah guitar/end credits)

However, recording session master tapes for seven 1970s-era Peanuts television specials scored by Guaraldi were discovered by his son, David, in the mid-2000s. The songs "Pitkin County Blues", "Play It Again, Charlie Brown" (aka "Charlie's Blues" and "Charlie Brown Blues"), "African Sleigh Ride", "Peppermint Patty", "Joe Cool" and "" (version 3, electric keyboard version) were released in 2007 on the compilation album, Vince Guaraldi and the Lost Cues from the Charlie Brown Television Specials.

In addition, a live version of "" was also released in 2008 on Live on the Air from a Vince Guaraldi Trio concert originally recorded on February 6, 1974 (exactly two years to the day before Guaraldi's untimely death). The song was also covered by New Age pianist George Winston on Love Will Come: The Music of Vince Guaraldi, Volume 2 (2010).

Credits
 Written and Created by: Charles M. Schulz
 Directed by: Bill Melendez
 Produced by: Lee Mendelson and Bill Melendez
 Original Music Composed and Performed by: Vince Guaraldi
 Music Supervision by: John Scott Trotter
 Graphic Blandishment: Ed Levitt, Evert Brown, Dean Spille, Frank Smith, Bernard Gruver, Carole Barnes, Ellie Bogardus, Phil Roman, Don Lusk, Bob Carlson, Sam Jaimes, Bill Littlejohn, Al Pabian, Rod Scribner, Hank Smith, Beverly Robbins, Eleanor Warren, Manon Washburn, Faith Kovaleski, Adele Lenart, Joanne Lansing, Dawn Smith, Joice Lee Marshall, Carla Washburn, Debbie Zamora
 "Joe Cool" Sung by: Vince Guaraldi
 Editing: Robert T. Gillis, Charles McCann, Rudy Zamora
 Recording:
 Voices: Radio Recorders, Coast Recorders
 Music: Wally Heider Recording
 Mix: Producers' Sound Service
 Camera: Dickson-Vasu, Tony Rivetti
 in cooperation with United Feature Syndicate, Inc. and Charles M. Schulz Creative Development, Corp., Warren Lockhart, President
 THE END "There's No Time for Love, Charlie Brown" © 1973 United Feature Syndicate, Inc. All Rights Reserved

References

External links
 

Peanuts television specials
Television shows directed by Bill Melendez
1970s American television specials
CBS original programming
1970s American animated films
1973 television specials
1973 in American television
CBS television specials
1970s animated television specials